Elnaz Shakerdoost (Persian: الناز شاکردوست; born June 28, 1984) is an Iranian actress. She has received various accolades, including a Crystal Simorgh, two Hafez Awards and two Iran's Film Critics and Writers Association Awards.

Early life
Shakerdoost was born June 28, 1984 in Tehran, Iran. She is the second child in the family and she have an older brother and a younger sister.

Before entering the cinema, she worked in student theaters, none of which were performed in public. During her school days, she also acted in student theaters. in 1997, she won the Best Actress Award at the Student Fajr Festival.

Filmography

Film

Web

Theatre

Awards and nominations

References
 
Elnaz Shakerdoost in Soureh Cinema
Elnaz Shakerdoost in Filcin

External links
 

Living people
1984 births
People from Tehran
Iranian film actresses
Iranian television actresses
Crystal Simorgh for Best Actress winners
Islamic Azad University, Central Tehran Branch alumni